Walter Charles Williams (born September 8, 1977) is a former American football running back who played two seasons with the Green Bay Packers of the National Football League. He played college football at Grambling State University and attended Brusly High School in Brusly, Louisiana. Williams was also a member of the New England Patriots, New Orleans Saints, Oakland Raiders and played for the Rhein Fire of NFL Europe. He was a member of the New England Patriots team that won Super Bowl XXXVI against the St. Louis Rams.

Professional career

New England Patriots
Williams was signed by the New England Patriots on April 27, 2001. He was placed on injured reserve on September 2, 2001.
Williams was released by the Patriots on August 14, 2002. He told the team he was considering retirement.

New Orleans Saints
Williams was signed by the New Orleans Saints and later released on August 25, 2003.

Green Bay Packers
Williams was signed by the Green Bay Packers on January 19, 2004.

Rhein Fire
Williams was allocated to NFL Europe by the Green bay Packers in 2004, where he played for the Rhein Fire.

Green Bay Packers
Williams was released by the Packers on September 4, 2004 and re-signed to the team's practice squad on September 15, 2004. He was promoted to the active roster on November 20, 2004.
He was released by the Packers on September 3, 2005 after battling an injury. He was re-signed by the Packers on October 25, 2005.

Williams was released on December 22, 2005 after being on injured reserve.

Oakland Raiders
Williams was signed to a one-year contract by the Oakland Raiders on May 9, 2006.
He was released by the Raiders on July 24, 2006.

References

External links
Just Sports Stats

Living people
1977 births
Players of American football from Baton Rouge, Louisiana
American football running backs
African-American players of American football
Grambling State Tigers football players
Green Bay Packers players
Rhein Fire players
21st-century African-American sportspeople
20th-century African-American sportspeople
New England Patriots players